Moamen Zakaria Abbas Eldawy (born 12 April 1988) is an Egyptian former professional footballer who plays as a winger. In 2020, he was diagnosed with amyotrophic lateral sclerosis.

In May 2022, former international teammate Mo Salah invited Zakaria to be part of Liverpool's celebrations after winning the 2022 FA Cup Final.

Honours
Zamalek
 Egyptian Premier League: 2014–15
 Egypt Cup: 2012–13, 2013–14
Al Ahly
 Egyptian Premier League: 2015–16, 2016–17, 2017–18, 2018–19,
 Egypt Cup: 2016–17
 Egyptian Super Cup: 2015, 2017

References

External links
 
 Eurosport: Moamen Zakaria
 
 soccerway: Moamen Zakaria

1988 births
Living people
Egyptian footballers
People from Sohag Governorate
Egypt international footballers
Al Masry SC players
Zamalek SC players
Al Ahly SC players
Egyptian Premier League players
Association football forwards
Al-Ahli Saudi FC players
Ohod Club players
Expatriate footballers in Saudi Arabia
Egyptian expatriate sportspeople in Saudi Arabia
Saudi Professional League players
People with motor neuron disease